Alexander Filimonov may refer to:

 Alexander Filimonov (Cossack) (1866–1948), ataman of the Kuban People's Republic
 Aleksandr Filimonov (born 1973), association football goalkeeper